Philippe Langenieux-Villard (born 1955) is a French politician.

Early life
Philippe Langenieux-Villard was born on May 20, 1955 in Paris, France.

Career
He joined the Rally for the Republic. He served as a member of the National Assembly from 1993 to 1997, representing Isère. He has served as the Mayor of Allevard since 1989.

He has written several books.

Bibliography
Aymeric Simon-Lorière (Paris: Cercle d'études et de recherches politiques, économiques et sociales, 1977, 84 pages).
L’Information municipale (Paris: Presses universitaires de France, 1985, 127 pages).
Lettre ouverte à ceux qui n'aiment pas la politique (Grenoble: Presses universitaires de Grenoble, 1988, 165 pages).
Les Stations thermales en France (Paris: Presses universitaires de France, 1990, 125 pages).
La Communication politique (with Sophie Huet, Paris: Presses universitaires de France, 1992, 207 pages).
Allevard-les-Bains, mémoire commune : un maire rend hommage à ses prédécesseurs (prefaced by Emmanuel Le Roy Ladurie, Écully: éditions Horvath, 1992, 174 pages).
L'Assemblée nationale (with Sylvie Mariage, coll. "Découvertes Gallimard" (nº 219), Paris: Editions Gallimard, 1994, 96 pages).
L’Administration en questions : rapport au Premier ministre (Paris: La Documentation française, 1995, 103 pages).
Place de la Résistance (Paris: Editions Alexandrines, 2005, 126 pages).
Le Livreur (Paris: Editions Henri d'Ormesson, 2007, 138 pages).
L’Affaire Rattaire (Paris: Editions Henri d'Ormesson, 2010).
La Pomme d’Alan Turing (Paris: Editions Henri d'Ormesson, 2013).
Les 100 mots des Alpes (with Jean Guibal, Paris: Presses Universitaires de France, 2014).

References

1955 births
Living people
Politicians from Paris
Rally for the Republic politicians
Deputies of the 10th National Assembly of the French Fifth Republic
Regional councillors of Auvergne-Rhône-Alpes
French non-fiction writers